The 1976 CONCACAF Champions' Cup was the 12th edition of the annual international club football competition held in the CONCACAF region (North America, Central America and the Caribbean), the CONCACAF Champions' Cup. It determined that year's club champion of association football in the CONCACAF region and was played from 6 June 1976 till 13 February 1977.

The teams were split in three zones (North American, Central American and Caribbean), each one qualifying the winner to the final tournament, where the winners of the North and Central zones played a semi-final to decide who was going to play against the Caribbean champion in the final. All the matches in the tournament were played under the home/away match system.

Salvadorean club Águila beat Surinamese Robinhood in the final to became CONCACAF champion for the first time in their history, and the second Salvadoran team to win the trophy.

North American Zone

First round

León on a bye.
Toluca on a bye.
Serbian White Eagles on a bye.
Toronto Italia advances to the second round.

Second round

 Serbian White Eagles withdrew.
 The Toronto Italia v Toluca matches were originally scheduled for July 16 and August 31, but Toluca asked to reschedule the series to September 5 and 8. After the matches were not played by September 8, CONCACAF disqualified Toluca. 
 León and Toronto Italia advanced to the third round.

Third round

Toronto Italia withdrew.
León advances to the CONCACAF Final.

Central American Zone

First round
Group A

Águila advances to the third round.

Group B

Round 2

Águila on a Bye to the third round
Real España withdrew
Diriangén advances to the third round.

Round 3

Águila advances to the CONCACAF Final.

Caribbean Zone

First round

Malvern United on a Bye
Robinhood, Voorwaarts and Tesoro Palo Seco advance to the second round.

Second round

Robinhood and Voorwaarts advance to the third round

Third round

Robinhood advances to the CONCACAF Final.

Semi-final 

Due to several players being sent off after a brawl, León forfeited the 2nd leg while leading 2–1: Águila was awarded a 2-0 win.

Final

First leg

Second leg 

Aguila won the series 4–2 on points (8–3 on aggregate).

Champion

References

1
CONCACAF Champions' Cup